John Scarle was keeper of the rolls of Chancery from 1394 to 1397 and Archdeacon of Lincoln before being named Lord Chancellor of England in 1399. He held that office until 9 March 1401. He was also Clerk of the Parliament (as the office was then known) between November 1384 and February 1397.

Notes

References
 Powicke, F. Maurice and E. B. Fryde Handbook of British Chronology 2nd. ed. London:Royal Historical Society 1961

See also
 List of Lord Chancellors and Lord Keepers

Year of birth missing
Year of death missing
Lord chancellors of England
Masters of the Rolls
14th-century English people
14th-century English clergy
Clerks of the Parliaments